Corethromyces is a genus of fungi in the family Laboulbeniaceae. The genus contains 82 species.

References

External links
Corethromyces at Index Fungorum

Laboulbeniaceae
Laboulbeniales genera